Gjakova is the seventh largest city of Kosovo and seat of Gjakova Municipality and Gjakova District. The city has 40,827 inhabitants, while the municipality has 94,556 inhabitants.

Geographically, it is located in the south-western part of Kosovo, about halfway between the cities of Peja and Prizren.

The city of Gjakova has been populated since the prehistoric era. During the Ottoman period, Gjakova served as a trading centre on the route between Shkodra and Constantinople. It was also one of the most developed trade centres at that time in the Balkans.

Name 

The Albanian name for the city is Gjakova, while the Serbian name is Đakovica with the common -ica diminutive placename suffix. There are several theories on the origin of the village name, such as from the personal name Jakov; the Serbian word đak (pupil); or from the Albanian word for "blood" (gjak).

The "Jakov theory" derives its name from Jakov, a little known nobleman in the service of lord Vuk Branković who founded and ruled the city, and whose coins have been found, signed "Jakov". According to local Albanians, the name was derived from the name Jak (Jakov), with the village name meaning "Jakov's field".

History

Ottoman Period 

Gjakova has been a settlement with an ethnic Albanian majority since its foundation in the late 16th century around the foundations of Hadim Suleyman Efendi, a politically important local Albanian. In the Ottoman defter (tax registry) of 1485, the "village of Đakovica" had 67 households. In the 17th century, Katip Çelebi and Evliya Çelebi mention this place as Jakovičse, with 2000 houses and 300 shops. During the early period of Ottoman rule, Gjakova and the Gjakova Municipality were part of the Nahiya of Altun-ili. Most of the villages in the Nahiya of Altun-ili were dominated by inhabitants with Albanian anthroponomy. This is seen by Selami Pulaha as an indication that during the 15th century (as supported by Ottoman defters), the lands between Junik and Gjakova were inhabited by a dominant ethnic Albanian majority. In 1570, the majority of the inhabitants of Gjakova as a settlement itself were recorded with Albanian anthroponomy; Albanian onomastics prevailed over Slav onomastics. According to Frederick Anscombe, the onomastics of the defter are not a reliable determinant of the ethnic make up.

The city had developed into an Ottoman trade center on the Shkodra–Istanbul route, with the marketplace being by the Hadum Mosque, built in 1594 by Mimar Sinan, financed by Hadum Aga. Evliya Çelebi mentioned it as a city in 1662, and described it as a flourishing and attractive town with 2,000 houses built of stone with roofs and gardens. The public buildings were situated on a broad plain and included two richly adorned congregational mosques, several prayer-houses, some inns with leaden roofs, a delightful bath-house (hamam), and about 300 shops like nightingale-nests. Between 3–6 September 1878, heavy fighting took place in Gjakovë between the nationalist Albanian League of Prizren and the Ottoman Empire. In the ensuing fight, 280 Ottoman soldiers were killed, including 2 Pashas, and a further 300 were wounded.

In May 1845, following Reşid Pasha's outlawing of the right to bear arms, 2,000 rebels from the Gjakova region, and the Gjakova Highlander tribes of Krasniqi, Gashi and Bytyçi rose in revolt. The rebels, about 8,000 men, drove the Ottoman garrison out of Gjakova. The Ottomans suppressed the rebellion, but did not succeed in establishing effective control of the region.

In 1862 the Ottomans sent Maxharr Pasha with 12 divisions to implement the Tanzimat Reforms in the Highlands of Gjakova. Under the leadership of Mic Sokoli and Binak Alia, the tribes of Krasniqi, Gashi, Bytyçi and Nikaj-Mertur organized a resistance near Bujan. The rebels were reinforced by the forces of Shala, led by Mark Lula. After heavy fighting, they managed to defeat the Ottoman force and expel them from the highlands.

Local Albanian leaders, such as Sulejman Aga of Botushë, organised resistance and movements for independence against the Ottomans throughout the 19th-20th centuries; in one such uprising, 5,000-6,000 Albanian fighters led by Sulejman Aga Batusha, gathered outside of Gjakova and attacked the garrison in an attempt to enter the city. In 1904, 10 Ottoman battalions accompanied by artillery were sent to Gjakova in order to quell the uprising. Shemsi Pasha and the Ottomans were then ordered to estimate the livestock possessions and to enforce heavy taxes upon the local Albanians in response to the uprising, and the hostilities were accompanied by the forcible collection of taxes from the local population and the destruction of entire villages in the Gjakova region by Ottoman forces; Upon arriving to Botusha, Shemsi Pasha, with five battalions and numerous artillery pieces, began bombarding the houses. The Ottomans were met by 300 Albanian resistance fighters led by Sulejman Aga Batusha. The resistance fighters had 35 dead or wounded, but the Ottomans lost more than 80 soldiers. Another 300 Albanian fighters arrived and surrounded the Ottoman force but could not yet finish them as the Ottomans were numerically-superior and were positioned well with cannons. 2,000 Albanian tribesmen would eventually gather to fight the Turks, and the Ottoman government sent 18 more battalions accompanied by artillery to quell this new uprising; Shkup's Vali, Shakir Pasha, also went to Gjakova. A series of ensuing battles followed in the Gjakova region, resulting in the deaths of more than 900 Ottoman soldiers as well as 2 bimbashis and a dozen officers, whereas the Albanians suffered only 170 dead or wounded. Shakir Pasha was thereby ordered to stand down.

Modern Period 

Gjakova suffered greatly from the Serbian and Montenegrin armies during the First Balkan War. The New York Times reported in 1912, citing Austro-Hungarian sources, that people on the gallows hanged on both sides of the road, and that the way to Gjakova became a "gallows alley." In the region of Gjakova, the Montenegrin military police formed the Royal Gendarmerie Corps (Kraljevski žandarmerijski kor), known as krilaši, which committed much abuse and violence against the non-Orthodox Christian population. The mass hanging of Albanian civilians in 1914 by the Serbo-Montenegrin army and the killing of Catholic priest Luigj Palaj were some of the most reported wartime events which took place in Gjakova.

Serbian priests forcibly converted Albanian Catholics to Serbian Orthodoxy. According to a 20 March 1913 Neue Freie Presse article, Orthodox priests and the military converted 300 Gjakova Catholics to the Orthodox faith; Franciscan Pater Angelus, who refused to renounce his faith, was tortured and killed with bayonets. The History Institute in Pristina reported that Montenegro converted over 1,700 Albanian Catholics to the Serbian Orthodox faith in the Gjakova region in March 1913. Albert von Mensdorff-Pouilly-Dietrichstein told Edward Grey in a 10 March 1912 interview that Serbian soldiers behaved in a "barbarous way" toward Muslim and Catholic Albanians in Gjakova. During World War II, when Kosovo was made a part of Greater Albania under Italian rule and later under German control, Serbs were persecuted by Albanian paramilitaries. A large number of killings of Serbs took place in 1941 in the district of Gjakova.

In 1953–56, a systematic campaign of police repression was conducted throughout Kosovo with the goal to force Albanians to leave the region. The first protest against the Yugoslav police which involved the unfurling of the banned Albanian national flag was held in Gjakova on May Day, 1956. This protest was soon followed by other protests which involved high school and university students who unfurled the Albanian flag in Yugoslavia. A total of 19 Albanians were assassinated by the Yugoslav secret police in Gjakova in these events.

In the events of the dissolution of Yugoslavia, the Union of Independent Trade Unions of Kosova (BSPK) was created in 1990. BSPK's members took pride in their large grassroots participation which reached 14,900 workers. The BSPK founding congress was held in Gjakova and despite gaining a permission to be legally held, the police broke it up during its second day. The city was badly affected by the Kosovo War, suffering great physical destruction and large-scale human losses and human rights abuses. In the rural locality of Meja, just 4 km outside Gjakova's city center, the mass killing of at least 377 Albanian males between the ages of 16 and 60 took place on April 27, 1999, by the Serbian police. It is the largest massacre of the Kosovo War.  Many of the bodies of the victims were found in the Batajnica mass graves. The International Criminal Tribunal for the former Yugoslavia has convicted several Serbian army and police officers for their involvement. Actions on the ground had a devastating effect on the city. According to the ICTY, OSCE, and international human rights organisations, about 75% of the population was expelled by Serbian police and paramilitaries as well as Yugoslav forces, while many civilians were killed in the process. Large areas of the city were destroyed, chiefly through arson and looting but also in the course of localised fighting between government security forces and members of the KLA. The actions of the government forces in Gjakova formed a major part of the United Nations war crimes indictment of the then-President Slobodan Milošević.  Yugoslav units were stationed in and near the city in two barracks due to the risk of an attack by the Kosovo Liberation Army (KLA) from across the border in Albania. In one incident, NATO aircraft misidentified a convoy of Albanian refugees and attacked it.

Most of the Albanian population returned following the end of the war. After that much of the town was rebuilt. Many Albanians viewed the Roma population as participants in war crimes and collaborators in acts of state repression. The Romani neighbourhood of Gjakova (Brekoc) was targeted and parts of it burnt down in mid-1999, about 600 Roma were moved to a refugee camp outside the town and as a result of political violence fifteen were reported killed or missing by August 1999. Fifteen Gjakova Romani were reported killed or missing in political violence as of August 1999. The majority of the Serbian population, numbering 3,000, fled Gjakova in June 1999 with only five Serbs remaining, living under guard by KFOR troops at a local Serbian Orthodox Church. In 2004, the last five remaining Serbs were expelled from Gjakova with the local Serbian Orthodox Church being destroyed by ethnic Albanians during rioting as part of the March unrest in Kosovo. About 15 Serbs had returned to Gjakova by the 2011 census.

Geography 

Gjakova is located in the south-western part of Kosovo. To the north-east of the city, the west Kosovan plain of Metohija opens, while in the south-west the peak of Accursed Mountains rises. The city is also situated at the entrance to the Erenik Valley, where the river Krena flows from the north to the Erenik mountain stream. After a few kilometers, it flows into the White Drin, the longest river in Kosovo. To the west of Gjakova lie the Gjakova Highlands, and to the north-east of the city is the Dushkaja region.

Climate 

Demography 

According to the 2011 census, the resident population was 94,556, of which urban inhabitants numbered 40,827 and rural 53,729; there were 47,226 males and 47,330 females. The ethnic groups include Albanians (87,672), Balkan Egyptians (5,117), Roma (738), Ashkali (613), and smaller numbers of Bosniaks (73), Serbs (17), Turks (16), Gorani (13) and others. Based on those that answered, the religious make-up was 77,299 Muslims, 16,296 Roman Catholics, 22 Orthodox Christians, 142 others, and 129 irreligious. Based on the population estimates from the Kosovo Agency of Statistics in 2016, the municipality has 95,433 inhabitants. According to OSCE estimations, before the Kosovo War of 1999 the municipality had a population of about 145,000, of which 93% were Kosovo Albanians and 7% non-majority communities, including some 3,000 Serbs, who mostly lived in Gjakova itself.

In 2021 Dragica Gasic, the first Serb returnee since the end of the Kosovo War in 1999 returned to her former apartment in Gjakova. Despite being legally allowed to return to her property by the Kosovo Property Agency, her return was marred by threats of violence and harassment from her ethnic-Albanian neighbors.

Kosovo does not have an official religion. As the rest of the country, the majority of Gjakova's population consider themselves Muslim. The minority of Gjakovas's religious population that is not Muslim practices Christianity in the form of Roman Catholicism and Eastern Orthodoxy. According to the census of 2011, the prominent religion is Islam, including 81.75% of the population, while 17.23% is Roman Catholic Christian, 0.02% Orthodox Christian and 1% other. 
Religious communities have educational institutions for their needs organized in accordance with applicable law.

Christianity has been around in Gjakova for a long time, going back all the way to the time of the Roman Empire. Islam in Gjakova began to be spread very early, during the Ottoman Rule.

Most Catholics live in the Rruga e Katolikëve street, where the two main churches are, and others in villages. The Muslims, living in other parts of the city and in most villages, have been encouraging the building of mosques, which could have counted about 10–15 buildings during the centuries.

Economy 

Gjakova built an economy based on farming and agriculture, lower trade and some types of manufacturing workshops which mainly produce for the needs of city-based products as imported cases. After World War II, Gjakova has built an economy based on industry and agriculture but also in the service sector. Nowadays, these subsequent shifts in transitional societies are escorted with shifts in the economic structure of the city. Therefore, Gjakova has an economic structure that is based on two pillars: in the private business sector and social business sector which is currently being privatized. Private business sector is in expansion and the main indicators qualify it as the main component of Gjakova's economy.

According to official sources identified in the Ministry of Trade and Industry, by the end of 2005 there were about 3,200 registered businesses that exercise activity in different areas of Gjakova, such as enterprise manufacturing, construction, service, trade, catering, craft, transportation, information technology, etc. Social economy in 1989 has counted 45 companies that have employed 18,640 workers. In non-economic activities (education, health, culture, government institutions, banks, etc.) there were employed 4000 workers. Furthermore, they also developed the private economy – where in 2010 approximately 920 employees were registered in the business entities. The economy of the municipality of Gjakova suffered mostly during the economic sanctions and the mass violence done by Serbian forces during the war. The situation further during NATO's intervention as a result of the destructive actions of multiple military and police forces, which have stood and operated in the economic enterprise facilities. This meant that during their withdrawal, these Serbian forces robbed, looted and destroyed most of the assets, inventories, transportation machines, etc. The losses that were done in the social economy as a result of the war were approximately 190 million DEM, whereas in the private economy around 100 million DEM.

According to official data, in 2006, there were 581 registered small and medium enterprises, in 2008 there were 3,120 such registered businesses, while in 2012 their number had reached 4,120. Gjakova currently has 12,000 people employed, in both the public and private sector, mostly in the latter. Although unemployment is high, there is a gradual increase of employment over the years according to data from the Kosovo Ministry of Work and Social Wellbeing. According to government statistics, in 2010, 40,000 people were registered as unemployed, while in 2011 this number decreased to 30,000 and in 2012 to 15,000. 30,000 people in Gjakova receive social assistance. This category includes poor families, people with disabilities, families of war veterans/victims and the retired.

Potential industry sectors in the municipality of Gjakova are:
 Metal industry, which produces metal ropes, nails, galvanized pipes, profiles of metal adhesive bandages. The existing industry also the production of electro motors for washing machines, engines for industrial applications, motors for hermetic compressors, finger jointed and Teflon containers, chimneys, elbows, enameled pots, technical gases, and chrome concentrate.
 Textile industry, which produced cotton spinning, cotton fabrics, artificial leather, underwear, lingerie costume for men, and different types of fabric (specifically jeans), etc.
 Chemical industry, involves production of the shampoo for domestic and industrial use and other chemical products which are used for household hygiene.
 Food industry, is mainly known with the production of flour, bread, eggs, pasta, chocolate, high quality wines, and fresh meat.
 Construction industry, Gjakova is also known for its construction materials industry, which involves the production of bricks, blocks, tiles, doors and windows, briquette, wooden cottages in the global level (log Houses ) and also the production of asphalt, fresh concrete, concrete slabs, and concrete pipes.

The municipal budget of Gjakova was subsidised by donations from USAID, CDF, Austrian Office in Kosovo, the European Commission and others, which over the past four years have done capital investments to the amount of €25 million: €5.4 million in 2010; €6.3m in 2011; €6.7m in 2012; €6.6m in 2013.
  
The capital investments in the municipality of Gjakova are mainly focused on the regulation of roads including the rehabilitation, pavement and partially their lighting. However, investments for the expansion of the sewage system and the regulation of the canalization remain insufficient. The total amount of funds that are available to the municipality of Gjakova during a year for capital investments lies somewhere over 6 million euros.

Dominated by small family businesses, retail stores, cafeterias and providers of basic services, the private sector of Gjakova remains weak. It makes up only 5.5 percent of all businesses registered in Kosovo. According to the Tax Administration Office in Gjakova, 88 to 93 percent of active businesses are businesses with a single owner, five to ten percent are businesses with limited liability and the remaining two percent are large businesses. As in any other place in Kosovo, more than 90 percent of the sector consists of small family businesses which cannot create growth with added value. Only 2 out of 53 studied businesses in the centre of Gjakova declared not having employed any relative.

Gjakova's private sector, as in other places of Kosovo, is dominated by small businesses which hire 1–5 employees in activities with small added value, such as wholesale and retail, or other service activities such as restaurants and hotels. Wholesale and retail represent 50.5 percent of registered businesses. Other sectors include hotels and restaurants (10.2 percent), production (9.7 percent), transport and communication (7.8 percent), construction (4.2 percent) and agriculture (1.7 percent) among others.

Outside of the city's centre, Gjakova's private sector is characterized by ex-social ventures. Only one of the 15 privatized social ventures and one of the two ventures with common shares are completely functional. Both ventures have to do with construction. One of them is "Dukagjini" with 109 employees, which is one of the biggest private employers in Gjakova today. The other venture is "NIKI-S" which at present has 279 employees and is considered the biggest company in Gjakova's municipality.

Infrastructure

Transport 

There are lots of infrastructure facilities of railways and platforms which currently are out of function.
Pristina International Airport is some 70 kilometres east of Gjakova. It is the only port of entry for air travelers to Kosovo. In northern of the city, there is the Gjakova Airport situated. The airport is expected to become public in the following years, to be used by low-cost commercial airlines and cargo flights.

Education 

Gjakova has a long tradition of education since the beginning of civil life. According to the Gjakova tradition the Hadim Aga library was so rich in books so it was said "Who wants to see the Kaaba, let them visit the library of Hadim Aga". The library had a reading room on the ground floor and the shelf with books upstairs.

According to some data, schools with Albanian as a language of instruction in the territory of Gjakova were opened before 1840. The Albanian intellectuals from the city, that were educated in the most important educational centers of the Ottoman Empire, had a special role in opening of schools in Albanian during the Albanian National Movement. 
A particular role in enriching the educational tradition in the region of Gjakova and beyond was the opening of religious schools, initially schools, later the madrasas.

The city has become an important university town. Today in the municipality of Gjakova, there is also a large number of primary and secondary schools, in the public sector, as well as in the private sector. The education system is organized in many schools and in the separate physical activity classes. During 2004, there was development respectively. There has been an increase in the number of private institutions, especially at the preschool level, but also in primary and secondary education.

The University of Gjakova Fehmi Agani, is one of the newest public universities in Kosovo. The university began operating on 1 October 2013. In 2014, the Gjakova Summer School for Entrepreneurship were opened in the city.

Culture 

Historical monuments in Gjakova are divided into three main categories based on their cultural, religious and social context. The core part of the city was created between the Krena River to the east and Cabrati hill to the west. Around the cornerstone of the town, the Old Bazaar – the center of trade and craftsmanship – was created. By 1900, the bazaar housed around 1000 enterprises. Numerous bridges were built to enable the journey of trade caravans across the neighboring rivers. With the fast development of trade in the city, several inns were built to host the many visitors. Because of its ancient origins and fast economic development, Gjakova has become of great historical importance.

The Old or Grand Bazaar (Çarshia e Madhe) in Gjakova is the oldest bazaar in Kosovo, and it served as an Ottoman trading centre and heart of the city economy. It suffered damage during the Kosovo War but has since been renovated. The Hadum Mosque, built in the 16th century, lies by the bazaar, and includes a highly decorated graveyard, where the city notables were buried. Within the mosque complex were the hamam which was destroyed in 2008, the "Old library" from 1671, damaged in the Kosovo War, and also a meytepi from 1777. The Bazaar is linked to the city centre, just five minutes away via the Islam-Beg Bridge. It is, however, still home to an active mosque, several türbes, and a clocktower.

The Hadum Mosque, located in the Old Bazaar, built in 1594 by Ottoman architect Mimar Sinan and financed by Hadum Aga. The mosque has played a significant role in the urban character of the city from the 17th to 20th centuries. Its construction was followed by the appearance of the craftsmanship around it, which increased the importance of the city. The mosque holds historical value and is viewed of as a sacred monument. The great Tekke ("Teqja e Madhe"), built by the end of 16th century by Shejh Suleyman Axhiza Baba, a Sufi mystic from Shkodra. It belongs to the Saadi order of Sufism. The complex includes turbe (small mausoleums), samahanes (ritual prayer-halls), houses and fountains. It is characterized with detailed sacral architecture, with wood-carved elements.

Gjakova is also characterized with two main Catholic Churches, which are part of the cultural heritage. The Saint Paul and Saint Peter Church (Albanian: Kisha e Shën Palit dhe Shën Pjetrit) is one of the tallest monuments in Gjakova, which can be seen from different points of the city. The arrival of the Albanian Catholics form Malesia resulted in rejuvenation of Saint Peter's Church in Gjakova in 1703, while in 1851 Gjakova's parish is rejuvenated. In 1999, after the War it was totally destroyed. In the same site the new cathedral has been built.

The Saint Ndou Church, was once called also the church of Padre Mila, who had built it in 1882, but it was later destroyed. In 1931, Padre Lorenc Mazrreku built in the same place the church that exists today, which was renovated few times, adding to it the guestrooms, offices and restrooms, but complying with the original architectural concept.

The Clock Tower, built just after the Hadum Mosque at a place known as Field of the Clock, characterizes the rapid economic development of Gjakova at that time. It was destroyed during the Balkan Wars, while the belfry was removed and transported to Montenegro. With sides 4.10m long and a height of about 30 meters, a new clock tower was built later near the foundations of the previous one. Constructed mainly of stone with the wooden observation area and the roof covered in lead, the clock tower is unique of its kind.

Festivals 

Events and festivals in Gjakova are not as much in numbers, as they are highly valued. The historic city of Gjakova, Kosovo, especially the Old Town, is the hub of many outdoor and indoor festivals, cultural events and street parades. Many of them are seasonal and take place only one time, while others are organised annually for many years by various festival societies. All of them draw interest from the locals and visitors alike. Some of the events are organised by the city, some by private companies as well.

Sports 

Apart from being a culture and educative center of the Kosovo, Gjakova is also known as a sport center. The best example of this is the fact of having 38 clubs, which compete in all leagues over Kosovo.
Gjakova's most successful team is KF Vëllaznimi which has won 9 titles of Kosovar Superliga and 4 Kosovo Cups.
"Shani Nushi" is the city's sports hall, which has a capacity of 3500 seats, while the Gjakova City Stadium has a capacity of 6000 seats.

International relations 

Gjakova is twinned with:
 Fort Dodge, United States
 Jamestown, United States
 Lodève, France
 Saranda, Albania

See also 
List of people from Gjakova

Notes

References

Sources

External links 

kk.rks-gov.net/gjakoveOfficial Website 

 
Cities in Kosovo
Municipalities of Kosovo
Gegëri